Mad-Croc Racing was an auto racing team that competed in the FIA GT1 World Championship. It was formed as the result of a collaboration between the Belgian Selleslagh Racing Team (SRT) and DKR Engineering of Luxembourg. The team took its name from the Mad-Croc brand of energy products that sponsored the team. The team ran a pair of Corvette C6.Rs in the championship, with SRT and DKR taking responsibility for one car each. In 2022 it was announced that the team will be partnering with AAS Motorsport in a m customer entry of a Bentley Continental GT3.

References

External links
 Sellaslagh Racing Team
 DKR Engineering

Belgian auto racing teams
FIA GT1 World Championship teams
Auto racing teams established in 2010
2011 disestablishments in Belgium
Auto racing teams disestablished in 2011
2010 establishments in Belgium